Nienhuisiella is a monotypic genus of gastropods belonging to the family Hygromiidae. The only species is  Nienhuisiella antonellae.

The species is found in Europe.

References

Hygromiidae